Venetiko, is a small uninhabited Greek island off the southern coast of the Peloponnese, south of the Cape Akritas. It belongs to the cluster of the Messenian Oinousses. It is administratively part of the municipality of Pylos-Nestor, in Messenia.
During the ancient times, it was called Theganoussa and it is mentioned by the Pomponius Mela, Pliny the Elder, Pausanias and Ptolemaeus.

Pausanias called it an uninhabited island, but it has been inhabited at some period since graves and ruins have been found.

It is included in the Natura 2000.Natura 2000

References

Ionian Islands
Landforms of Messenia